The Gyalectaceae are a family of fungi in the order Gyalectales.

Genera
According to a 2022 estimate, Gyalectaceae contains 6 genera and 89 species (including 11 species in genus Cryptolechia).
Francisrosea  – 1 sp.
Gyalecta  – 50 spp.
Neopetractis  – 2 spp.
Ramonia  – 24 spp.
Semigyalecta  – 1 spp.

The genus Cryptolechia was synonymized with Gyalecta in 2019.

References

Gyalectales
Lecanoromycetes families
Taxa named by Ernst Stizenberger
Taxa described in 1862
Lichen families